Sir Christopher Morris (c. 1490 – 3 September 1544), also known as Morice or Mores, was an English soldier and military administrator during the reign of Henry VIII. He served as Master of the Ordnance from 1537 until his death in 1544.

Career
Sir Christopher Morris was probably born about 1490. On 4 December 1513 he was made gunner in the Tower of London, with a salary of 12d. a day, and the appointment was confirmed on 14 August 1514. In the following March Morris was serving at Tournai, but soon returned to his post at the Tower, where he apparently remained until the summer of 1522. He was on board one of the vessels which, under Thomas Howard, Earl of Surrey's command, escorted Charles V to Biscay after his visit to England in 1522; in July a detachment with artillery was landed on the coast of France near Morlaix, which was captured, "for the master gunner, Christopher Morris, having certain falcons, with the shot of one of them struck the lock of the wicket in the gate, so that it flew open," and the town was taken. In August 1523 Morris was acting as lieutenant-gunner before Calais, and on the 23rd of that month he sailed with the vice-admiral, Sir William Fitzwilliam (later Earl of Southampton), and landed near Treport; after severe fighting they re-embarked, burning seven ships and capturing twenty-seven pieces of ordnance. In April 1524 Morris was at Valenciennes in charge of the ordnance; in the same year he was appointed "overseer of ordnance," and commissioned to search the Isle of Thanet for the goods of a Portuguese vessel that had been beached there.

For some time afterwards Morris was employed mainly in diplomatic work; at the end of 1526 or beginning of 1527 he was sent with letters to the English envoys at Valladolid, and started back with their despatches on 1 February 1526–7. In the same year he was appointed chief gunner of the Tower, and in September was bearer of instructions to William Knight, the envoy at Compiègne. In 1530 he served in Ireland, and in January 1530–1 before Calais; in the same year he inspected the mines at Llantrisant, Glamorganshire, as the king's commissioner, and appears as owner of a ship. After serving on a commission to survey the land and fortifications of Calais and Guisnes, commanding a company of artillery at the former place, and inspecting the fortifications of Carlisle in 1532, Morris was in 1535 despatched on a mission to North Germany and Denmark, probably to enlist gunners and engineers in the English service. He visited Hamburg, Lübeck, Rostock, and all the principal towns in Denmark and Zealand, returning on 27 June. In August he was at Greenwich, engaged in enlisting men, and in September was ordered to proceed with three ships to Denmark; the order was, however, countermanded, and Morris was again sent to Calais. On 8 February 1537, he succeeded Bernardin de Valois (Bernardyne de Wallys) as Master of the Ordnance, with a salary of 2s. a day for himself, 6d. for a clerk, and 6d. for a yeoman. Before October he was recalled, and was in London ready to march northwards to assist in suppressing the Pilgrimage of Grace. In 1537 Morris was again at Carlisle inspecting the fortifications, which had been declared unsound ; was granted license to be "overseer of the science of artillery;" appointed master gunner of England, and on 31 July landed at Calais, where in 1539 he was one of the commissioners appointed to receive Anne of Cleves; on 18 October he was knighted at the creation of the Earl of Hertford and Southampton. In 1542 Morris was in England superintending the artillery, not always with success, for of the pieces despatched for the war in Scotland in October 1542 all but one burst. In March 1543–4 he joined Edward Seymour, Earl of Hertford's expedition to Scotland. Landing near Leith, which was immediately captured, Morris accompanied the army to Edinburgh, where on 7 May he blew in the Netherbow Port with a culverin; the next day he bombarded the castle, without effect, for two hours and was compelled to retreat.

Death
In the autumn of 1544 Morris, as chief director of the batteries, was at Boulogne in France, where on 3 September he received a wound, which proved fatal. He was buried in St Peter's Church, Cornhill, London. Elizabeth, Lady Morris died in 1551 and was buried 22 May at St Olave Old Jewry.

Notes

Attribution

References

External links
 St Peter upon Cornhill

16th-century English soldiers
Knights Bachelor
1490s births
1544 deaths